BUE may refer to:
 The British University in Egypt, a private university in Egypt
 Built up edge, a phenomenon of single point cutting operations in steel
 Bué, a village in France
 Buenos Aires, the capital of Argentina